Lorand Fenyves (February 20, 1918 – March 23, 2004) was a Canadian violinist and professor, based primarily at the University of Toronto.

References

1918 births
2004 deaths
Canadian male violinists and fiddlers
20th-century Canadian violinists and fiddlers
Canadian classical violinists